Don Ritter (1959) is a Canadian artist known for his interactive electronic installation works.

Life
Don Ritter was born in 1959 in Camrose, Alberta. He was a professor in the School of Creative Media at the City University of Hong Kong. Ritter studied electronics engineering at The Northern Alberta Institute of Technology, fine arts and psychology at the University of Waterloo, and visual studies at MIT's Center for Advanced Visual Studies and the MIT Media Lab.

Work
Ritter's work brings together computers, sensors, and the human body to create interactive experiences for audiences. Ritter has said that "the experience of interactive art should be an aesthetically pleasing experience not only for the mind but also for the body".
His software Orpheus (1987), which enabled an improvising musician to control the narrative projection of video, is an early example of an interactive video installation.
In his 1993 interactive installation Intersection, viewers cross a virtual highway in a large darkroom . The highway is represented by the computer-controlled sound of cars passing and coming to a screeching halt.

Ritter has collaborated with the American trombonist George E. Lewis.

References

1959 births
Canadian installation artists
Academic staff of the City University of Hong Kong
People from Camrose, Alberta
Living people